The Bavarian Open is an annual international figure skating competition organized by the Skating Union of Bavaria. Since 2011, it is sanctioned by the Deutsche Eislauf Union and the International Skating Union. The event is held in February at Eissportzentrum Oberstdorf in Oberstdorf, Germany. Medals may be awarded in men's singles, ladies' singles, pair skating, and ice dance.

Senior medalists

Men

Women

Pairs

Ice dance

Junior medalists

Men

Women

Pairs

Ice dance

Novice medalists

Men

Ladies

Pairs

Ice dance

References

External links 
 Bayerischer Eissport-Verband

Figure skating competitions
International figure skating competitions hosted by Germany
2008 establishments in Germany
Recurring sporting events established in 2008